This is a compilation of results for teams representing France at official international women's football competitions, that is the UEFA Women's Cup and its successor, the UEFA Women's Champions League. France was first represented in them by Toulouse in the inaugural 2001–02.

France is along with Germany one of the two associations that have won the competition in the Champions League era through Olympique Lyonnais with three titles. Paris Saint-Germain has also reached the final. As of the 2016–17 edition France is ranked second at the association rankings with a coefficient of 76,000 and it is thus one of the twelve UEFA members granted two spots in the competition.

Teams
These are the five teams that have represented France in the UEFA Women's Cup and the UEFA Women's Champions League.

Qualification

Progression by season

1 Group stage. Highest-ranked eliminated team in case of qualification, lowest-ranked qualified team in case of elimination.

Results by team

Juvisy

Montpellier

Olympique Lyonnais

Paris Saint-Germain

Toulouse

References 

Women's football clubs in international competitions
 Women